Nicolai Ditlev Ammon Ræder (16 September 1817 – 22 July 1884) was a Norwegian jurist and civil servant.

Ræder was born at Kongsvinger in Hedmark, Norway.  He was the son of Johan Christopher Ræder and Karen Sophie Hedevig Munch.  He was the brother of Ole Munch Ræder, Jacques Ræder and Johan Georg Ræder.

A jurist by education, he worked as a government official in various government ministries, and as a Bailiff (Fogd) in Hallingdal.

In 1870, he became County Governor of Nordre Bergenhus amt, which he held until 1875 when he became County Governor of Søndre Bergenhus amt. He held this position until his death in 1884.

References

1817 births
1884 deaths
People from Kongsvinger
Norwegian jurists
County governors of Norway